Kristian Peshkov (born 26 January 1996 in Varna) is a Bulgarian footballer who plays as a midfielder or forward for Chernomorets Balchik.

Career
In January 2014, Kostadinov was included in Cherno More's 25-man squad for their training camp in Turkey. Kristian made his first team début in a 1-1 home draw against Litex on 18 April 2014, coming on as substitute for Ivan Kokonov.

Career statistics

References

External links

1996 births
Living people
Bulgarian footballers
Association football forwards
PFC Cherno More Varna players
FC Botev Vratsa players
PFC Dobrudzha Dobrich players
FC Chernomorets Balchik players
First Professional Football League (Bulgaria) players